Raphael Carl Lee (born October 29, 1949, in Sumter, South Carolina) is an American surgeon, medical researcher, biomedical engineer, and entrepreneur.

Life
Lee spent his childhood and adolescence in South Carolina.  During medical school and graduate school he lived in Philadelphia, Chicago and Boston.  Today, he practices reconstructive plastic surgery at the University of Chicago.  Mostly his research has focused on advancing the care of trauma victims.  Lee is recognized for the application of block copolymer surfactants to mimic some basic cellular protective processes of natural stress proteins to augment cellular self-repair capability following injury. He has also advanced understanding the biophysical mechanisms of tissue injury and neuromuscular disorders in survivors of electrical shock.

He is the Paul S. and Ailene T. Russell Professor of Surgery at the University of Chicago and holds appointments in the departments of Medicine (Dermatology), Molecular Medicine, and Organismal Biology and Anatomy.  Dr. Lee is the Director of the University of Chicago's Laboratory for Molecular Regeneration.
 
Lee graduated from Bishop England High School in Charleston, South Carolina and then studied engineering at the University of South Carolina in Columbia, South Carolina.  He completed the electrical engineering curriculum in 1971 with an interest in medical applications.  He then enrolled in the combined medicine and engineering curriculum established by Temple University School of Medicine and Drexel University College of Engineering in central Philadelphia.  Dr. Lee was elected to the Alpha Omega Alpha honor medical society and the Tau Beta Pi engineering honor society. He completed both M.D. and M.S. degrees in 1975.  This was followed by general surgery residency training at the University of Chicago Hospitals in Chicago and then plastic surgery residency training at the Massachusetts General Hospital.  While a resident at the University of Chicago, he enrolled in graduate studies at M.I.T. and in Harvard-MIT Division of Health Sciences and Technology doctoral program.  He received a Sc.D. in bioelectrical engineering from the Massachusetts Institute of Technology in 1979.  He received several significant awards for his research during his surgical residency training including the Schering Scholar Award in 1978 from the American College of Surgeons and MacArthur Prize Fellows Award in 1981 from the John D. and Catherine T. MacArthur Foundation in Chicago.

While on the faculty at Harvard Medical School he received the James Barrett Brown Award from the American Association of Plastic Surgeons for advancing the understand of electrical injuries.  He returned to the University of Chicago in 1990 where he practices plastic surgery and teaches graduate courses in molecular pathogenesis of disease.  Dr. Lee has served as President of the American Institute for Medical and Biological Engineering, the Midwestern Association of Plastic Surgeons, the Drexel 100 Society, and the Society for Physical Regulation of Biology and Medicine. He a clinical investigator at the University of Chicago who was elected to the Institute of Medicine of Chicago, the International Academy of Medical and Biological Engineering and the American Academy of Arts and Sciences..

He is founder and chairman of RenaCyte BioMolecular Technologies (2005) and Avocet Polymer Technologies (1997).  He is affiliated with the Chicago Electrical Trauma Rehabilitation Institute.

Current Research 
Lee's current research includes biophysical dynamics of cell injury and modes of molecular repair Design principles and applications of block copolymers are also studied to mimic the behavior of small molecular weight natural cellular molecular chaperones. Lee is focusing on molecular dynamic simulations to optimize design and tissue studies, for optimization of tissue preservation.

Selected awards
 Alpha Omega Alpha - Temple University
 Tau Beta Pi - Drexel University
 Schering Scholar in Surgery, American College of Surgeons
 Sigma Xi - Massachusetts Institute of Technology
 1981 Fellow MacArthur Fellows Program
 1985 Scholar Searle Scholars Program
 Distinguished Medical Alumnus Award, Temple University School of Medicine
 1894 Engineering Society - University of South Carolina
 Fellow, American Institute for Medical and Biological Engineering
 Life Fellow, Institute of Electrical and Electronics Engineers
 Fellow, Biomedical Engineering Society
 Fellow, American College of Surgeons
 Fellow, International College of Surgeons
 Fellow, American Association of Plastic Surgeons
 Member, American Surgical Association
 Fellow, American Association for the Advancement of Science
 Member, National Academy of Engineering
 Drexel 100 Society, Drexel University
 Member, International Academy of Medical and Biological Engineering
 Awarded Golden Key to City of Shanghai
 2018 Pierre Galletti Award Recipient, American Institute for Medical and Biological Engineering

Works

Raphael C Lee and Anna Chien  The Doctor's Plague: Germs, Childbed Fever, and the Strange Story of Ignac Semmelweis. (Book Review)  Perspectives in Biology and Medicine - Volume 48, Number 4, Autumn 2005, pp. 616–618
M. Capelli-Schellpfeffer, M. and R.C.Lee, "Electrical Shock" in Encyclopedia of Electrical and Electronics Engineering, Webster, J.G., Ed., John Wiley and Sons, New York, 1998
R. C. Lee, "Electrical and Lightning Injuries" in Harrison's Principles of Internal Medicine, 15th Edition, Braunwald et al., eds. McGraw-Hill, New York 2001

Author or coauthor of more than 200 journal publications and book chapters

References

American surgeons
1949 births
People from Sumter, South Carolina
MacArthur Fellows
Living people
University of South Carolina alumni
Temple University School of Medicine alumni
Drexel University alumni
MIT School of Engineering alumni
Fellows of the American Association for the Advancement of Science
Fellows of the American Institute for Medical and Biological Engineering
Fellow Members of the IEEE
Fellows of the Biomedical Engineering Society